L37 may refer to:
 60S ribosomal protein L37
 Grand Canyon Caverns Airport, in Coconino County, Arizona
 , a destroyer of the Royal Navy
 Mitochondrial ribosomal protein L37